Acalolepta ussurica is a species of beetle in the family Cerambycidae. It was described by Nikolay Nikolaevich Plavilstshchikov in 1951. It is known from Russia and Siberia.

References

Acalolepta
Beetles described in 1951